Donnacha O'Brien (born 22 July 1998) is an Irish racehorse trainer and former jockey who competed in Flat racing.

O'Brien is the son of multiple champion trainer Aidan O'Brien and brother of jockey and trainer Joseph O'Brien. Donnacha O'Brien rode his first winner on Quartz, trained by his father, at Dundalk Stadium in September 2014, and gained his first Group 1 victory when he rode Intricately to win the 2016 Moyglare Stud Stakes. Intricately was bred by his mother, Anne Marie, and trained by his brother. O'Brien was Irish flat racing champion apprentice jockey in 2016 and Irish flat racing Champion Jockey for the first time in 2018. He retained his title in 2019, beating Colin Keane in a season which saw two jockeys ride over 100 winners in a season in Ireland for the first time.

O'Brien announced his retirement from race riding on 25 November 2019 and announced his intention to take up training.

Major wins as a jockey

 Ireland
Irish Derby - (1) - Latrobe (2018)
Moyglare Stud Stakes - (2) - Intricately (2016), Happily (2017)

 Great Britain
2000 Guineas - (2) - Saxon Warrior (2018), Magna Grecia (2019)
Cheveley Park Stakes - Fairyland (2018)
Epsom Oaks - Forever Together (2018)
Middle Park Stakes - Ten Sovereigns (2018)
Vertem Futurity Trophy - Magna Grecia (2018)

Major wins as a trainer
 Ireland
Moyglare Stud Stakes - (1) - Shale (2020)

 Great Britain
Nassau Stakes – (1) - Fancy Blue (2020)

 France
 Critérium International - (1) -  Proud and Regal (2022)  
 Prix de Diane – (1) -  Fancy Blue (2020)

References 

Living people
1988 births
Irish jockeys
Irish racehorse trainers